The Episcopal Diocese of Vermont is the diocese of the Episcopal Church in the United States of America in the state of Vermont. It was the first diocese in the Episcopal Church to elect a woman, Mary Adelia Rosamond McLeod, as diocesan bishop.

The see city is Burlington, where the Cathedral Church of St. Paul is located.

Bishops
 1. John Henry Hopkins, 1832–1868;
 2. William H. A. Bissell, 1868–1893;
 3. Arthur C. A. Hall, 1894–1929
 William Farrar Weeks, coadjutor, 1913–1914;
 George Y. Bliss, coadjutor, 1915–1924;
 Samuel B. Booth, coadjutor, 1925–1929
 4. Samuel B. Booth, 1929–1935;
 5. Vedder Van Dyck, 1936–1960;
 6. Harvey Butterfield, 1961–1973;
 7. Robert S. Kerr, 1974–1986;
 Daniel L. Swenson, coadjutor, 1986;
 8. Daniel L. Swenson, 1987–1993;
 9. Mary Adelia Rosamond McLeod, 1993–2001;
10. Thomas Clark Ely, 2001–2019.
11. Shannon MacVean-Brown, (2019–present)

On May 18, 2019, the church elected Shannon MacVean-Brown as the eleventh Bishop of Vermont. Macvean-Brown was consecrated on September 28, 2019 in Ira Allen Chapel in Burlington. Macvean-Brown is the first African-American Bishop of Vermont.

Diocesan churches of historical interest
Present or former diocesan churches listed on the National Register of Historic Places include:
 Christ Church (Guilford, Vermont)
 Church of Our Saviour (Killington, Vermont)
 St. Ann's Episcopal Church (Richford, Vermont)
 St. Bartholomew's Episcopal Church (Montgomery, Vermont)
 St. John's Episcopal Church (Highgate Falls, Vermont)
 St. James' Episcopal Church (Arlington, Vermont)

References

External links
Official Web site of the Diocese of Vermont
Journal of the Annual Convention, Diocese of Vermont at the Online Books Page
The Correspondence of John A. Graham with His Grace of Canterbury: When on His Mission as Agent of the Church of Vermont, to the Ecclesiastical Courts of Canterbury and York, for the consecration of Dr. Peters, Bishop-elect of Vermont, 1794–5, etc. 1835

Vermont
Episcopal Church in Vermont
Religious organizations established in 1832
Anglican dioceses established in the 19th century
1832 establishments in Vermont
Province 1 of the Episcopal Church (United States)